Broken Vows is a 1987 television film directed by Jud Taylor. It stars Tommy Lee Jones and Annette O'Toole.

Plot
Peter McMahon is priest is summoned to a deprived neighborhood to give a stabbing victim their last rites as he dies in his arms, He doesn't "die in his arms". Jones' character doesn't touch him until he closes the dead man's eyes. but soon gets entangled in friendship with the dead man's girlfriend Nim, as they collectively attempt to solve the murder. McMahon faces a battle in his commitment to the church and whether his involvement still represents his commitment to his faith.

Cast

Production
The script is based on the novel Where the Dark Streets Go by Dorothy Salisbury Davis.

Reception
Mike Duffy from the Detroit Free Press praised the movie as "an impressive cut above the average TV movie", describing it as an "arresting drama" and giving it 3 stars, believing that it was a lot better than how it was portrayed in commercials. Faye B. Zuckerman, writing for The Manhattan Mercury considered the movie "noteworthy", praising O'Toole's "sensitive portrayal" of the victim's girlfriend but reserved the most recognition for the "notable performance" of Walsh, who she described as "multitalented". Michael Hill from The Evening Sun had a mixed view on the movie, describing it "as interesting as it is confusing", while praising the "excellent" O'Toole in her portrayal as a free-spirit artist and giving the film 3 stars after describing the conclusion as "oblique".

References

External links

Films directed by Jud Taylor
American thriller television films
American romantic thriller films
1987 films
1980s American films